Uganda competed at the 1964 Summer Olympics in Tokyo, Japan.

Athletics

Men
Track & road events

Women
Track & road events

Boxing

Men

References
Official Olympic Reports

Nations at the 1964 Summer Olympics
1964
1964 in Ugandan sport